The Kiul River is a tributary of Ganges. It originates in Giridih of Jharkhand and flows through Lakhisarai, Sheikhpura and Jamui districts of the Indian state of Bihar and joins Harohar river in the Diara region.

Course
The Kiul originates from the Tisri Hill Range in Kharagdiha police station area of Giridih district. After forming the boundary of the district for a short distance it enters Jamui district through a narrow gorge near the Satpahari hill. It first flows in an easterly direction close to the southern base of the Girdheswari Hills. It turns northward at their eastern extremity and passes near the town of Jamui. Two miles south of Jamui it is joined by Barnar, below this point it receives the Alai, a mountain stream and near Jamui railway station it is joined by the Anjan. It then flows north-east up to Lakhisarai, It passes below the railway bridge between Kiul junction and Lakhisari station and is joined a few miles north of that place, near Rahuaghat, by the Harohar (Halahar or Harhobar), a continuation of the Sakri River. After this it turns due east and falls into the Ganges near Surajgarha. Until it meets the Harohar the Kiul has broad sandy bed and in some places is as much as half a mile wide, though it contains very little water in summer.

Tal
It is a saucer shaped depression extending from Fatuha in the west to Lakhisarai in the east. It runs close to and almost parallel to the right bank of the Ganges. The Harohar River which is the main outlet channel for the tal area flows eastward and drains into the Kiul River. The entire Tal area undergoes submergence every year during the monsoon period from June through September. At the end of the monsoon, the agricultural activities in the upper catchment of Kiul-Harohar suffer due to scarcity of irrigation water.

References

Rivers of Jharkhand
Rivers of Bihar
Rivers of India